Edward John Cobbett (1815–1899) was an English watercolour and oil painter.

Background

Cobbett was born in Marylebone, London, in 1815. He was a member of the Savage Club in his younger days, "when Bohemianism and exclusiveness were the purport of all its rules". He had a "considerable circle of artistic friends ... he was to the last generation of artistic Bohemians well known". In 1971 and 1881 he was living at 20 Oakley Square, St Pancras, London, with his wife Mary Anne née Haynes and four daughters including Theodosia Mary Ann Cobbett (born 1841), Phoebe Maria Cobbett (born 1849), Edith Haynes Cobbett (born 1856), and Gertrude Winifred Cobbett (born 1862). He described himself as an "artist, figure and landscape".

His daughter Gertrude Winifred married Gerald Aubrey Goodman in 1885.

Cobbet moved to Surrey, retired in 1885, and died aged 84 at Avondale, Winchmore Hill, North London on 11 October 1899. He is buried in a family grave on the western side of Highgate Cemetery.

Training and career
Cobbett was originally a wood carver, and at the time of his death in 1899, some of his carving could still be seen in the choir of York Minster. However when he was twenty years old he became a painter.

Cobbet was a pupil of Joseph William Allen. "He quickly made a name for himself as one of the chief exponents of the rustic school of painting which had a great vogue from about the middle of the century to the early 'eighties". He worked in London and Addlestone, Surrey.

Works
Cobbett was known for idyllic rustic scenes and depictions of children.

Exhibitions
Cobbett exhibited at the British Institution, the Royal Academy from 1833 to 1880 (including "over thirty consecutive years"), the Suffolk Street Gallery and the Society of British Artists, particularly on landscape and flower subjects.

Collections
 Mercer Art Gallery, Harrogate: Peeling Apples (undated)

Notes

References

External links

1815 births
1899 deaths
Burials at Highgate Cemetery
Landscape artists
English watercolourists
19th-century English painters
English male painters
English landscape painters
Artists from London
People from Addlestone
19th-century English male artists